Elsa Maria Teixeira de Barros Pinto is a São Tomé and Príncipe politician, and the country's former Defence and Justice Minister and from December 2018 until September 2020 Foreign Minister. 

In 2003 and 2004 (at least), she was a member of the Council of Ministers, as Secretary of State for Administrative Reform and Public Administration, and was a member of the Movement for the Liberation of São Tomé and Príncipe/Social Democratic Party (MLSTP-PSD) political party. In 2004, she was also Minister for Justice.

According to Pravda, she was Minister of Defence, as well as Minister for Justice, from 2008 to 2010. According to Whitaker's Almanack, she was still Minister of Defence as of July 2011.

In February 2013, she was the Attorney-General of São Tomé and Príncipe, when she was exonerated by a presidential decree of having issued a cheque for US$15,000 with insufficient funds to honour it to pay for car hire charges during the 2011 presidential elections.

In November 2015, she stood against Aurélio Martins (the incumbent, and competing for the second time, having been the party leader since 2011) for the leadership of the Movement for the Liberation of São Tomé and Príncipe/Social Democratic Party (MLSTP-PSD) political party after the economist Agostinho Meira Rita merged his candidacy with hers.

References

Living people
Women government ministers of São Tomé and Príncipe
Movement for the Liberation of São Tomé and Príncipe/Social Democratic Party politicians
Female defence ministers
21st-century women politicians
Year of birth missing (living people)
Foreign Ministers of São Tomé and Príncipe
Female foreign ministers
21st-century São Tomé and Príncipe politicians